Iefata "Fata" Sini (born 24 December 1966) is a Samoan former professional rugby league, and international rugby union footballer. After representing Samoa in the 1995 Rugby Union World Cup, playing fly half, he was signed by English rugby league club Salford Reds. He also played for York, Doncaster and Workington Town.

References

External links
RedPlanet

1966 births
Living people
Samoa international rugby union players
Rugby union fly-halves
Samoan rugby league players
Rugby league wingers
Samoan rugby union players
Salford Red Devils players
York Wasps players
Doncaster R.L.F.C. players
Workington Town players